Plessis is an unincorporated community in Lincoln Township, O'Brien County, Iowa, United States.

References

Unincorporated communities in O'Brien County, Iowa
Unincorporated communities in Iowa